Iziaslav or Zaslav is one of the oldest cities in Volhynia. Situated on the Horyn river in western Ukraine, the city dates back to the 11th century. Iziaslav belongs to Shepetivka Raion of Khmelnytskyi Oblast. It hosts the administration of Iziaslav settlement hromada, one of the hromadas of Ukraine. Population:

History 
Izyaslav was first mentioned in 1390. It was a private town in Poland, owned by the Zasławski and Sanguszko families. It was part of the Polish Volhynian Voivodeship. In 1583 it was granted Magdeburg city rights.

After the Partitions of Poland Izyaslav was part of the Russian Empire – Volhynian Governorate.

At the beginning of World War II, the town had a Jewish population representing 28% of the inhabitants. As soon as the Germans occupied the town, Jews were kept imprisoned in a ghetto and were later murdered in mass executions perpetrated by Einsatzgruppen.

Until 18 July 2020, Iziaslav was the administrative center of Iziaslav Raion. The raion was abolished in July 2020 as part of the administrative reform of Ukraine, which reduced the number of raions of Khmelnytskyi Oblast to three. The area of Iziaslav Raion was merged into Shepetivka Raion.

Historical demographics of Iziaslav

Monuments 

 Starozaslavsky Castle
 Novozaslavsky Castle
 St. John Cathedral
 Great Synagogue
 Church of St. Michael and Bernardine monastery
 Church of St. Joseph and Lazarists monastery
 Lazarists Hospital
 Palace of Sanguszko
 Cloth Hall
 Novozaslavsky Synagogue

Hotels

 Hotel Zaslav is a three-star hotel and restaurant. 25 Mykola Mykytiuk street, Iziaslav 30300.
 Hotel Yavir. 18 Nezalezhnosti street, Iziaslav 30300.

Notable people
 Anatoliy Aleksandrov (born 1951), rector of the Bauman University, Moscow
 Dmytro Chyhrynskyi (born 1986), Ukrainian professional footballer
  (1838–1926), Polish historian
  (1696–1765), Italian-Polish Baroque architect
 Nathan ben Moses Hannover (17th century), Ruthenian Jewish historian, Talmudist, and kabbalist
 Bill Mazer (1920–2013), American television and radio personality
  (b. 1914 in Iziaslav; d. 1988 in the US), architect and artist
 Leonard Nimoy (1931–2015), American actor (played Spock in Star Trek); parents born in Iziaslav, emigrated to Boston, USA
 Myroslav Popovych (1930–2018), Ukrainian philosopher
 Tzvi Tzur (1923–2004), Israeli officer, IDF Chief of Staff (1961–1963)
 Aleksander Zasławski (died 1629), Polish-Lithuanian noble, voivode of Bracław
 Władysław Dominik Zasławski (c. 1616–1656), Polish nobleman of Ruthenian stock, prince of the princely houses of Poland

References

External links
 
 Zaslav in Internet Encyclopedia of Ukraine
 Iziaslav Castle
 International Association of Jewish Genealogical Societies (Izyaslav, Ukraine)
 The murder of the Jews of Iziaslav during World War II, at Yad Vashem website.

Cities in Khmelnytskyi Oblast
Zaslavsky Uyezd
Volhynian Voivodeship (1569–1795)
Cities of district significance in Ukraine
Populated places established in the 11th century
Holocaust locations in Ukraine